The 1954 Arkansas State Indians football team represented Arkansas State College—now known as Arkansas State University—as an independent during the 1954 college football season. Led by first-year head coach Glen Harmeson, the Indians compiled a record of 1–8.

Schedule

References

Arkansas State
Arkansas State Red Wolves football seasons
Arkansas State Indians football